Wolfhound is a 2002 American erotic thriller film directed by Donovan Kelly and Jim Wynorski. It was shot in Ireland.

External links

2002 films
American thriller films
Films shot in Ireland
Films directed by Jim Wynorski
2000s erotic thriller films
2000s English-language films
2000s American films